Ragsdale Farm, also known as Magnolia Farms, is a historic farm and national historic district located in Jamestown, Guilford County, North Carolina.  The district encompasses 13 contributing buildings, 2 contributing sites, and 4 contributing structures on a mid-20th century "gentleman's farm."  They include the Ragsdale House (1880, 1900, 1948), a large two-story, Colonial Revival-style frame dwelling; granary, garage / wood shed; dog house; two chicken coops; fowl house; corn crib; privy; pump house; well house; cow barn; tenant house; and the domestic and agricultural landscapes.

It was listed on the National Register of Historic Places in 1991.

References

Farms on the National Register of Historic Places in North Carolina
Historic districts on the National Register of Historic Places in North Carolina
Colonial Revival architecture in North Carolina
Buildings and structures in Guilford County, North Carolina
National Register of Historic Places in Guilford County, North Carolina